Robert Frances Marsh (born 20 December 1968) is an Antiguan cyclist. He competed in the individual road race at the 1992 Summer Olympics. He is a two-time National Road Race Champion and a five-time National Time Trial Champion.

Major results

2006
 2nd Road race, National Road Championships
2007
 1st  Road race, National Road Championships
2009
 1st  Time trial, National Road Championships
2010
 National Road Championships
1st  Time trial
2nd Road race
2011
 National Road Championships
2nd Time trial
2nd Road race
2012
 1st National Time Trial Championships
2013
 National Road Championships
2nd Time trial
2nd Road race
2014
 National Road Championships
2nd Time trial
3rd Road race
2015
 National Road Championships
1st  Time trial
3rd Road race
2017
 National Road Championships
1st  Road race
2nd Time trial
2018
 National Road Championships
1st  Time trial
2nd Road race
2021
 1st  Time trial, National Road Championships

References

External links

1968 births
Living people
Antigua and Barbuda male cyclists
Olympic cyclists of Antigua and Barbuda
Cyclists at the 1992 Summer Olympics
Place of birth missing (living people)
Competitors at the 2006 Central American and Caribbean Games